Kindle may refer to:

Companies and products
 Amazon Kindle, an e-reader line by Amazon.com
 Kindle Direct Publishing, an e-book publishing platform by Amazon
 Kindle Store, an online e-book e-commerce store by Amazon
 Kindle Banking Systems, a company that produced banking software
 Kindle Entertainment, a children's television production company based in London, England

Other uses
 Kindle (surname)
 Generation Kindle, authors who publish their works digitally through Kindle Direct Publishing
 Kindle County, a fictional US county in novels by Scott Turow
 Kris Kindle or Secret Santa, a Western Christmas tradition

See also 
 Amazon Fire, formerly known as Kindle Fire, a tablet line by Amazon
 Kindling (disambiguation)